Thieme may refer to:
 Thieme Medical Publishers
 Thieme-Becker, a commonly used abbreviation for the German encyclopaedia of artist biographies by Ulrich Thieme and Felix Becker. 
Anthony Thieme (1888–1954), landscape and marine painter 
Carl von Thieme (1844–1924), German banker
Fabien Thiémé (1952–2019), French politician
Hugo Paul Thieme (1870–1940), American literary critic, bibliographer and university professor
Marianne Thieme (born 1972), Dutch animal rights activist and chairwoman of the Party for the Animals
Paul Thieme (1905–2001), scholar of Vedic Sanskrit
Richard Thieme (born 1944), American business consultant, author, media commentator and speaker
Robert Thieme (1918–2009), American Christian minister
Thomas Thieme (born 1948), German actor

Surnames from given names